American Bird Conservancy (ABC) is a non-profit membership organization with the mission of conserving wild birds and their habitats throughout the Americas. Its focus is on threats to birds in the Western Hemisphere – threats which include overuse of pesticides, urban sprawl, habitat destruction, and invasive species.

ABC is the second BirdLife International partner in the United States and works in cooperation with other groups and agencies, including The Bird Conservation Alliance, Partners in Flight, and the North American Bird Conservation Initiative. Overall, ABC’s network spans 15 countries and protects over a million acres – benefiting birds large and small.

Their partner projects have included publication of bird guides, education on the location and construction of wind turbines, educating farmers to promote bird-friendly agriculture, and raptor conservation. Their Conservation Counterparts Program helps other organizations fundraise for Latin America and Caribbean conservation projects.

One of ABC's key strategies involves working with conservation partners to establish and sustain protected reserves across the Americas, including safe havens for Araripe Manakin Antilophia bokermanni in Brazil (with partner Aquasis), and Blue-billed Curassow Crax alberti in Colombia (alongside Fundación ProAves).

Programs and projects

Latin America 
In Latin America American Bird Conservancy  works with partner groups such as Fundación ProAves to purchase land that protects endangered bird habitat. They are also working with partner organizations to reduce the conversion of coffee farms that offer habitat to the cerulean warbler, by helping growers market premium beans as cerulean warbler-friendly. In Colombia they have helped to protect wintering bird habitat by partnering with Fundación ProAves to help create the first preserve dedicated to a single U.S. migrant, the Cerulean Warbler Bird Reserve. Also in Colombia, they helped fund an expedition in 2010 that discovered two nesting colonies of the endangered Baudó oropendola, one of the rarest birds in the world with less than a dozen known birds before the discovery.

United States
Several organizations, including the American Bird Conservancy and the United States Geological Survey, were commissioned by the U. S. Federal Government to study the US State of Birds in 2007. They found that 800 species of birds in the U.S. were "endangered, threatened or in significant decline", with more birds threatened in the state of Hawaii than any other region. The study found that 39% of ocean birds were declining in population. They also learned that conservation efforts are very effective at helping bird populations to recover, with positive increases in some wetland bird species due to wetland conservation.

In the U.S., they are trying to stop mountaintop mining in the Appalachias in order to protect vital breeding habitat. In 1996, after American Bird Conservancy threatened to sue the U.S. Navy over the San Clemente loggerhead shrike (Lanius ludovicicanus mearnsi) whose habitat was formerly used by the Navy for bombardment training, the Navy agreed to take steps to protect the species and its habitat.

Cats Indoors is a public education campaign by American Bird Conservancy to encourage control of cats in order to protect birds from predation by cats. The objective of the Conservancy's campaign is that all domestic cats should be contained or leashed when outdoors or kept indoors.

ABC supports renewable energy as vital in the fight against climate change, and promotes siting of wind facilities to minimize impacts on birds.

References

External links 

Environmental organizations based in Virginia
Nature conservation organizations based in the United States
Ornithological organizations in the United States
Organizations established in 1994
Bird conservation organizations